Escape and Plasma Acceleration and Dynamics Explorers (EscaPADE) is a planned spacecraft mission to Mars consisting of two spacecraft known as Blue and Gold. The mission, expected to launch in October 2024, is part of NASA's SIMPLEx program.

Mission 
EscaPADE is led by scientists at the University of California, Berkeley. At a cost of US$80 million, the mission will demonstrate the ability for low cost planetary space exploration. The spacecraft will study the Martian magnetosphere and how solar wind affected the planet's atmosphere. In February 2023 Blue Origin won a contract to launch the mission in 2024.

Instruments and science goals 

The science goals of EscaPADE are to:
 understand the processes controlling the structure of Mars' hybrid magnetosphere and how it guides ion flows; 
 understand how energy and momentum are transported from the solar wind through Mars' magnetosphere; 
 understand the processes controlling the flow of energy and matter into and out of the collisional atmosphere.

Each identical EscaPADE spacecraft has a mass under 90 kg. The spacecraft bus is 60 x 70 x 90 cm. The spacecraft is powered by two 480 x 70 cm solar panel wings extending from opposite sides of the spacecraft. These charge batteries and power the solar-electric propulsion system. Cold gas thrusters are used to maintain orientation. Communications are in X-band via a 60 cm diameter dish antenna. A 90 cm boom extends above the spacecraft holding some of the science instruments.

There are three science experiments onboard each spacecraft, EMAG, EESA, and ELP. EMAG is a magnetometer that will measure DC magnetic fields up to 1000 nT, mounted at the end and partway up the boom. EESA is an electrostatic analyzer designed to measure suprathermal ions from 2 eV to 20 keV and suprathermal electrons from 3 eV to 10 keV. It is mounted on the upper deck of the spacecraft bus. ELP is a Langmuir probe measuring plasma density from 20 - 30,000 particles per cubic cm and solar EUV flux from 5 - 20 milliwatts per square meter, and is mounted on the boom and on the spacecraft bus.

After launch, EscaPADE will reach Mars and go into a highly elliptical orbit. Over roughly the next two years the orbit will be lowered and circularized until it reaches the nominal science orbit. The initial science campaign involves both spacecraft flying in the same orbit, 200 x 7000 km with an inclination of 60 degrees. This will last approximately 6 months, at which time one of the spacecraft will go into a 60 degree inclination orbit which "crosses" the orbit of the other spacecraft, both still with 200 km perigees. This campaign will operate for approximately 6 months.

Further reading 
 ESCAPADE: A TWIN-SPACECRAFT SIMPLEX MISSION TO UNVEIL MARS’ UNIQUE HYBRID MAGNETOSPHERE

References 

NASA space probes
Missions to Mars
2024 in spaceflight